Joseph Henry Joof (born 25 October 1960) is a Gambian lawyer, politician, and writer. He attended Keele University from 1981 to 1985. From 1998 to 2001, he served as president of the Gambia Bar Association, and later as Attorney General and Minister of Justice of the Gambia from 2001 to 2003.

In March 2019, The Point newspaper reported that Manneh died in mid-2008 while being transported from a police station to Diabugu Batapa hospital. It is said that he was buried behind the local police station.

References

1960 births
Living people
Gambian diplomats
20th-century Gambian lawyers
Gambian politicians
Government ministers of the Gambia
21st-century Gambian lawyers